Sharlston is a civil parish in the metropolitan borough of the City of Wakefield, West Yorkshire, England.  The parish contains six listed buildings that are recorded in the National Heritage List for England.  Of these, one is listed at Grade II*, the middle of the three grades, and the others are at Grade II, the lowest grade.  The parish contains the village of Sharlston and the surrounding area.  The most important building in the parish is Sharlston Hall, which is listed, together with associated structures, and the other listed building is a private house.


Key

Buildings

References

Citations

Sources

 

Lists of listed buildings in West Yorkshire